Arthur L. Swartz (September 10, 1888 – May 14, 1940) was an American politician from New York.

Life
He was born on September 10, 1888, in Buffalo, New York. He attended Public School Nr. 13 and Masten Park High School.

Swartz was a member of the New York State Assembly (Erie Co., 7th D.) in 1929, 1930, 1931, 1932, 1933, 1934, 1935 and 1936; and was Chairman of the Committee on Penal Institutions from 1934 and 1936.

He was a member of the New York State Senate (50th D.) in 1939 and 1940.

He died on May 14, 1940, at his home in Kenmore, New York, of heart disease; and was buried at the Forest Lawn Cemetery in Buffalo.

Sources

External links
 

1888 births
1940 deaths
Republican Party New York (state) state senators
Politicians from Buffalo, New York
Republican Party members of the New York State Assembly
Burials at Forest Lawn Cemetery (Buffalo)
20th-century American politicians